Sternbergia is a genus of Eurasian and North African plants in the Amaryllis family, subfamily Amaryllidoideae.

The genus comprises eight recognised species that show a broad distribution throughout the Mediterranean Basin as well as central and southwestern Asia.

Sternbergia contains a number of species of flowering bulbs which rather resemble Crocus.
These plants produce golden-yellow goblet-shaped flowers borne on stalks some way above the ground that open during the autumn or early winter.
The flower is composed of six stamens and a single style attached to an inferior ovary.
Long, strap-like leaves may appear with the flowers or sometime after. The only two exceptions to this are S. vernalis and S. candida which flower in the spring, with S. candida producing striking white flowers.

The genus has gained notability due to the widespread use of one of its species, S. lutea, as a garden plant. This species has been found in cultivation for several hundred years, and has become naturalised in many parts of northern Europe, well beyond its natural range.

Sternbergia lutea was first described in 1601 by Clusius, who included the plants in the genus Narcissus.
Carl Linnaeus in 1753 regarded them as part of Amaryllis.
It was not until 1825 that the species was transferred to Sternbergia, using the generic name coined in 1804.
The genus was named in honor of Count Kaspar von Sternberg.

Species

, the World Checklist of Selected Plant Families recognizes eight species:

Sternbergia candida B.Mathew & T.Baytop - Turkey
Sternbergia clusiana (Ker Gawl.) Ker Gawl. ex Spreng., including S. grandiflora Boiss. ex Baker, S. latifolia Boiss. & Hausskn. ex Baker, S. macrantha (J.Gay) J.Gay ex Baker, S. sparffiordiana Dinsm., S. stipitata Boiss. & Hausskn. - Aegean Islands, Middle East
Sternbergia colchiciflora Waldst. & Kit., including S. alexandrae Sosn., S. citrina (Herb.) Ker Gawl. ex Schult. & Schult.f., S. etnensis (Raf.) Guss., S. exscapa Tineo in G.Gussone - southern + southeastern Europe from Spain to Ukraine; Morocco, Algeria, Caucasus, Middle East
Sternbergia lutea (L.) Ker Gawl. ex Spreng., including S. aurantiaca Dinsm., S. sicula Tineo ex Guss, S. greuteriana Kamari & R.Artelari - southern Europe from Spain to Balkans; Middle East, Caucasus, Turkmenistan, Tajikistan; naturalized in North Africa
Sternbergia minoica Ravenna Autumn daffodil - Crete
Sternbergia pulchella Boiss. & Blanche in P.E.Boissier - Syria, Lebanon
Sternbergia schubertii Schenk - İzmir Province in western Turkey
Sternbergia vernalis (Mill.) Gorer & J.H.Harvey, including S. fischeriana (Herb.) Roem. - Middle East, Caucasus, Central Asia

formerly included
Three names have been coined using the name Sternbergia but referring to species now considered better suited to other genera (Colchicum, Narcissus and Zephyranthes). We provide links to help you find appropriate information.
 Sternbergia americana - Zephyranthes americana 
 Sternbergia caucasica - Colchicum trigynum 
 Sternbergia exigua - Narcissus cavanillesii

References

External links 
 Pacific Bulb Society: Sternbergia

Amaryllidaceae genera
Amaryllidoideae